Miguel Angel Suárez Mesa (born 14 September 1999) is a Colombian weightlifter. He is a three-time gold medalist in the men's 55kg event at the Pan American Weightlifting Championships. He also won two gold medals at the 2022 Bolivarian Games held in Valledupar, Colombia.

Career 

He won the gold medal in the men's 55kg event at the 2020 Pan American Weightlifting Championships held in Santo Domingo, Dominican Republic.

In 2021, he won the gold medal in his event at the Pan American Weightlifting Championships held in Guayaquil, Ecuador. In that same year, he competed in the men's 55kg event at the World Weightlifting Championships held in Tashkent, Uzbekistan.

In 2022, he won the gold medal in the men's 55kg event at the Pan American Weightlifting Championships held in Bogotá, Colombia. He also set a new Panamerican record of 142kg in the Clean & Jerk.

He won the bronze medal in the men's 55kg Clean & Jerk event at the 2022 World Weightlifting Championships held in Bogotá, Colombia.

Achievements

References

External links 
 

Living people
1999 births
Place of birth missing (living people)
Colombian male weightlifters
Pan American Weightlifting Championships medalists
21st-century Colombian people